The 2011 SaskTel Tankard was held February 2–6 at the Battleford Curling Club in North Battleford, Saskatchewan. The winning Pat Simmons team (skipped by Steve Laycock) represented Saskatchewan at the 2011 Tim Hortons Brier in London, Ontario.

Teams

Draw Brackets

A Event

B Event

C Event

Results
All times CST

Draw 1
February 2, 3:00pm

Draw 2
February 2, 7:00pm

Draw 3
February 3, 8:30am

Draw 4
February 3, 3:00pm

Draw 5
February 3, 7:00pm

Draw 6
February 4, 8:00am

Draw 7
February 4, 12:00pm

Draw 8
February 4, 4:00pm

Draw 9
February 4, 8:00pm

Draw 10
February 5, 9:00am

Draw 11
February 5, 2:00pm

Playoffs

1 vs. 2
February 5, 7:00pm

3 vs. 4
February 5, 7:00pm

Semi-final
February 6, 9:30am

Final
February 6, 2:00pm

External links
Saskatchewan Curling Association homepage
Internet Archive: Event homepage

References

SaskTel Tankard
North Battleford
February 2011 sports events in Canada
Curling in Saskatchewan
2011 in Saskatchewan